Screech is the mascot of the Washington Nationals. He is a bald eagle that wears the home cap and jersey of the team. He was "hatched" on April 17, 2005 at the "Kids Opening Day" promotion at RFK Stadium. The mascot’s name is based on the sound that is made by actual bald eagles. A nine-year-old fourth grade student in Washington D.C., Glenda Gutierrez, designed the mascot and won a contest sponsored by the team and explained that it was "strong and eats almost everything."

In 2009, the Nationals unveiled a redesigned Screech. The new costume, designed by Major League Baseball's design department made the mascot slimmer and gave the mascot a removable cap. The Nationals explained that the original design was of an eagle that was always intended to grow up one day. A Nationals official described him as "like a teenager now". The 2012 Topps Opening Day card described Screech as a dazzling dancer, full of loyal shenanigans directed at the opposing team.  "Screech" received a shoutout in Donny Hathaway's old-school classic Howard U / DC track "Sugar Lee".

In subsequent years, the team created built a number of in-stadium traditions around the mascot. Screech became the official judge of the team's Presidents Race, and carries a flag around the field after victories. An annual "Kids Opening Day" event, held on a Sunday home game each April, was expanded to include a celebration of Screech's birthday. Additional costumes were added, including a special birthday hat, rain gear worn after rain delays, a Jedi robe worn on Star Wars Day, and pajamas worn during extra innings of late night games.

Screech store at the ballpark
See: Nationals Park#"Screech" store

See also
List of Major League Baseball mascots
Youppi!, the preceding mascot of the franchise when it was based in Montreal as the Expos, and current mascot of hockey's Montreal Canadiens

References

External links

Screech's Main Bio
Washington Nationals' Main Kids Page
Screech The Eagle Twitter Page
Let Teddy Win blog posts tagged #screech

Major League Baseball team mascots
Washington Nationals
Bird mascots
2005 establishments in Washington, D.C.
Culture of Washington, D.C.